Jerry Lawrence Dixon (born September 15, 1967) is an American musician, and one of the original members of the 1980s rock band Warrant.

Dixon started playing the bass guitar at 13 years of age.  His first bass was a used Sears model that he had purchased from a friend for $30. Dixon joined Warrant while still in high school (11th grade).  Dixon has been influenced musically by Geezer Butler and Rudy Sarzo.

Discography

With Warrant
 Dirty Rotten Filthy Stinking Rich (1989, Columbia) – #10, 2× Platinum
 Cherry Pie (1990, Columbia) – #7, 2× Platinum
 Dog Eat Dog (1992, Columbia) – #25, Gold
 Ultraphobic (1995, CMC)
 Belly to Belly (1996, CMC)
 Greatest & Latest (1999, Deadline) (new versions of previous Warrant songs)
 Under the Influence (2001, Downboyrecords)
 Born Again (2006)
 Rockaholic (2011) – #22 Billboard Hard Rock 
 Louder Harder Faster (2017)

Guest appearances
 "Walk – Don't Run" on DJ Ashba's Addiction to the Friction (1996)

References

Living people
American heavy metal bass guitarists
American male bass guitarists
Warrant (American band) members
1967 births
Musicians from Pasadena, California
Guitarists from California
American male guitarists
20th-century American bass guitarists